Parectropis similaria, the brindled white-spot, is a moth of the family Geometridae.  The species was first described by Johann Siegfried Hufnagel in 1767. It is found in most of Europe.

The wingspan is 33–39 mm. The moth can be distinguished from its congeners by the white spot next to the wavy line on the outer edge of the front wing.
Adults are on wing in May and June.

The larvae feed on the foliage of Quercus and Betula species. The larvae can be found in autumn.

References

External links

Lepiforum e.V.

Boarmiini
Moths of Japan
Moths of Europe
Taxa named by Johann Siegfried Hufnagel